Nikola Đokić (also transliterated Nikola Djokić; born 31 May 1992) is a Serbian football goalkeeper.

External links
 
 
 
 Nikola Đokić at Utakmica.rs 

1992 births
Living people
Association football goalkeepers
Serbian footballers
FK Čukarički players
Serbian SuperLiga players